John Trevor Roberts, 2nd Baron Clwyd of Abergele in the County of Denbigh (28 November 1900 – 30 March 1987), also Sir John Trevor Roberts, 2nd Baronet, was a Welsh peer. He was known as Trevor Roberts.

Background and early life
Roberts was the son of John Roberts, 1st Baron Clwyd and of Hannah, Lady Roberts, a daughter of William Sproston Caine MP. He was also the grandson of John Roberts MP, of Abergele, Denbighshire.

He was educated at Gresham's School and Trinity College, Cambridge (BA 1922).

Career
Roberts was admitted a barrister of Gray's Inn in 1930 and served as assistant secretary of commissions in the Lord Chancellor's Department of the House of Lords from 1948 to 1961. He was appointed a JP for London in 1950 and succeeded his father as a member of the House of Lords in 1955. He had houses in London and in Selborne, Hampshire.

Family
In 1932, Roberts married Joan de Bois (died 1985), daughter of Charles R. Murray, of Partickhill, Glasgow, and they had one son, John Anthony Roberts, 3rd Baron Clwyd (born 2 January 1935, died 2006) and one daughter Alison Roberts, (born 24 February 1939).

Notes

References
Clwyd, John Trevor Roberts in Who Was Who 1897-2006 online, from Clywd, John Trevor Roberts (Retrieved 22 August 2007)
Kidd, Charles, Williamson, David (editors), Debrett's Peerage and Baronetage (1990 edition, St Martin's Press, New York, 1990), 

1900 births
1987 deaths
Alumni of Trinity College, Cambridge
2
People educated at Gresham's School
Members of Gray's Inn
Civil servants in the Lord Chancellor's Department